Sir Charles Hume, 4th Baronet (died c. 1750) was a baronet of the Baronetage of Ireland. The baronetage became extinct on his death without an heir.

References 

Baronets in the Baronetage of Ireland
Charles
Irish people of Scottish descent
1750s deaths
Year of death uncertain